All This Everything is the third album by rock band Perpetual Groove.

Track listing
 "Life – 1:32 
 "All This Everything (part 1)" – 4:47
 "All This Everything (part 2)" – 5:12
 "53 More Things to Do in Zero Gravity" – 4:41
 "Andromeda" – 2:45 
 "Long Past Settled In" – 6:42
 "Crockett & Tubbs" – 7:13
 "The Universe" – 1:57
 "Stealy Man" – 5:55
 "Left to Drifting" – 5:10
 "Scooter" – 4:20
 "Gone 'Round the Twist" – 1:55
 "Occam's Blazer" – 7:35
 "For Now Forget" – 4:59
 "And Everything" – 2:16

Personnel 

Brock Butler – acoustic guitar, electric guitar, vocals, lap steel guitar, baritone guitar
Robert Hannon – producer, engineer, audio production
Allen Johnson – photography
Matt Mcdonald – organ, synthesizer, piano, vocals
Rodney Mills – mastering
Adam Perry – synthesizer, bass, synthesizer bass
Albert Suttle – percussion, drums, sound effects
Jeff Wood – artwork, design

2004 albums
Perpetual Groove albums